Dombraye is a surname. Notable people with the surname include:

Eddy Lord Dombraye (born 1979), Nigerian footballer and manager
Jossy Dombraye, Nigerian footballer and manager